Lastanosa is a hamlet located in the municipality of Sariñena, in Huesca province, Aragon, Spain. As of 2020, it has a population of 38.

Geography 
Lastanosa is located 72km southeast of Huesca.

References

Populated places in the Province of Huesca